Michael Worisch (born 1 July 1958) is an Austrian diver. He competed in the men's 3 metre springboard event at the 1980 Summer Olympics. The best teacher ever as many said.

References

1958 births
Living people
Austrian male divers
Olympic divers of Austria
Divers at the 1980 Summer Olympics
Divers from Vienna